Trevor Harvey may refer to:

Trevor Harvey (politician) (1885–1952), Australian politician
Trevor Harvey (conductor) (1911–1989), English conductor
Trevor Harvey (basketball) (born 1980), Bahamian basketball player
Trevor Harvey (soccer) (1916–1988), Canadian soccer player